Norby is an American situation comedy series that aired on NBC from January 5 to April 6, 1955. The first television series filmed in color, it was created by David Swift and lasted one season and 13 episodes.

Premise
Pearson Norby is the vice president in charge of small loans at a small-town bank in Pearl River, New York. At the bank, he works with Mr. Rudge, another vice president and efficiency expert, and Wahleen Johnson, the telephone operator. Some sources claim the bank is run by an unnamed Bank President, while others identify Mrs. Maude Endles as its president. Norby lives in Pearl River with his wife Helen, daughter Diane, and son Hank. Bobo and Maureen live next door to the Norbys.

Cast
David Wayne as Pearson Norby
Joan Lorring as Helen Norby
Susan Hallaran as Diane Norby
Evan Elliott as Hank Norby
Janice Mars as Wahleen Johnson
Ralph Dunn as Mr. Rudge
Carol Veazie as Mrs. Maude Endles
Jack Warden as Bobo
Maxine Stuart as Maureen
Paul Ford as Bank President

Production
Norby was created by writer David Swift. The series was filmed in color, with exterior shots filmed on location in Pearl River, New York. Other filming was done at 20th Century Movietone Studios in New York City, with no laugh track. Eastman Kodak was the sponsor (that company's first venture into TV sponsorship). Kodak also made the film used for the series. The lack of availability of affiliates for the program's time slot "was probably the chief factor behind its early cancellation". Swift was the producer, and he directed some episodes, with Richard Whorf and Rogers Brackett directing others. Writers included George Kirgo, James Lee, Harvey Orkin, David Rayfiel, and Paul West. John Graham and Max Allentuck were associate producers.

Broadcast history
Norby aired at 7:00 p.m. on Wednesdays throughout its 13-episode run. It was replaced by Kodak Request Performance, a film series that included plays from Ford Theatre and from Top Plays of 1955.

Critical reception
Critic Jack Gould, in a review of the first episode of Norby in The New York Times, described the program as being "off to an extremely wobbly start". He wrote that the show made the title character too much like fathers in other TV situation comedies and that situations in the episode strained plausibility. His most positive comments regarded the quality of the episode's color, which he said also resulted in an improved picture on black-and-white TV sets.

A review of the same episode in the trade publication Broadcasting said that the program avoided "much of the nonsense that clutters too many of the series' family contemporaries on TV". If other episodes followed that trend, the review sais, "viewers are in for solid, warm entertainment".

Episodes
Source

References

External links
 
 TV Guide
 Norby opening credits on YouTube
 Norby closing credits on YouTube

1955 American television series debuts
1955 American television series endings
1950s American sitcoms
American workplace comedy television series
English-language television shows
NBC original programming
Television shows filmed in New York (state)
Television shows set in New York (state)